The Texas French Symposium is a statewide non-profit competition in which French students, which are categorized into levels 1-6 and Experienced compete with other students of their same level from all over the state of Texas. The organization is hosted annually at a random participating high school in Texas who volunteers to host. The contest is held on a spring weekend and lasts two days. It begins with tests in the late afternoon of the first day and lasts until 21:00. The competition resumes on the next day at 8:30 and is closed with a ceremony that includes dinner and awards. During the Symposium, students are involved in assigned academic events which are from the following:

 French Tests (required for all participants)
 Civilization
 Grammar
 Listening Comprehension
 Vocabulary
 Drama Group
 Drama Solo
 Guided Speaking
 Poetry
 Prose
 Sight-Reading
 Dictée (new in 2015)
 Baccalauréat (a quiz-like team competition on French language, culture, and history)

In addition to the aforementioned academic events, the Symposium also has certain events dedicated to francophone cultural arts, including music and visual arts. Students can compete in the following events:

 Music
 Instrumental Group
 Instrumental Solo
 Piano (Solo)
 Vocal Group
 Vocal Solo
 Visual Arts
 Pencil/Charcoal
 Pastel/Colored Pencil
 Painting: Acrylic & Oil
 Mixed Media: Two-dimensional artwork
 Watercolor
 Project
 Digital Media
 Bande Dessinée (comic strip)
 Video
Symposiums are hosted at high schools in the state of Texas, the first having been held in 1964 at MacArthur High School in San Antonio. In 2014, celebrating its 50th anniversary, the Texas French Symposium was hosted at Atascocita High School. 

The symposium is only funded by donations and entry fees. The judges are teachers and French speaking volunteers.

Notable and Recent Events
 1964 - MacArthur High School 
 1965 - MacArthur High School 
 1974 - MacArthur High School 
 1991 - Eisenhower High School
 1995 - MacArthur High School 
 1998 - Eisenhower High School
 2009 - Eisenhower High School
 2011 - Clements High School
 2013 - Sam Rayburn High School
 2014 - Atascocita High School 
 2015 - Klein Forest High School
 2016 Spring Woods High School
 2017 - Atascocita High School 
 2018 - The Woodlands High School
 2020 - Cancelled
 2021 - Virtual event
 2022 - Kingwood Park High School

References

French-American culture in Texas
Organizations based in Texas